Club Municipal may refer to:

 Club Centro Deportivo Municipal, a football club from Peru
 Club Social y Deportivo Municipal, a football club from Guatemala